Bishanopliosaurus is a genus of plesiosaur. The type species is B. youngi, based on remains found in the Ziliujing Formation of China.

Description

It can be differentiated by the bifurcated ribs of its sacrum. Unusually, it appears to be a freshwater plesiosaur. A second species, B. zigongensis, is known from the slightly later Xiashaximiao Formation.

See also

 Timeline of plesiosaur research
 List of plesiosaurs

References

Plesiosaurs of Asia
Early Jurassic plesiosaurs
Fossils of China
Fossil taxa described in 1980
Toarcian genera
Sauropterygian genera